Group III may refer to:

Chemistry
In the periodic table Group III formerly included these:
Group 13 elements:  boron (B), aluminium (Al), gallium (Ga), indium (In), thallium (Tl).
Group 3 elements:  scandium (Sc) and yttrium (Y) plus the lanthanide and actinide series elements.

Biology
 The dsRNA viruses (e.g. Rotavirus) according to the Baltimore classification.
 Group III introns, a class of introns found in mRNA genes of chloroplasts in euglenoid protists.

Other 
 Group III motor oil base stock as classified by the American Petroleum Institute